Crassa unitella is a moth of the family Oecophoridae. It is known from most of Europe.

The wingspan is 18–20 mm. Adults are on wing from early June to the end of August.

The larvae feed on dead wood and fungus under the bark of various trees. The larvae hibernate. Pupation takes place in the larval feeding place.

References

Oecophorinae
Moths of Europe
Moths described in 1796